Macrocneme chrysitis, the southern cyan tiger moth, is a moth of the subfamily Arctiinae. It was described by Félix Édouard Guérin-Méneville in 1844. It is found in Texas, Mexico, Guatemala, Nicaragua, Panama and Rio Grande do Sul, Brazil.

References

Macrocneme
Moths described in 1844
Taxa named by Félix Édouard Guérin-Méneville